Casuarius lydekkeri, also called the pygmy cassowary, is an extinct species of cassowary.

Distribution and habitat 
Casuarius lydekkeri was distributed in New South Wales during the Pleistocene, its bones being found in caves near Wellington significantly further south than extant cassowaries, which are confined to Far North Queensland. It is also known from deposits from the central highlands, Papua New Guinea.

References

 
Extinct birds of Australia
Pleistocene birds
Flightless birds
Fossil taxa described in 1911